HMS Malaya was one of five s built for the Royal Navy during the 1910s. Shortly after commissioning in early 1916, she participated in the Battle of Jutland of the First World War as part of the Grand Fleet. In the Second World War, Malaya served mostly in escort duties in the Mediterranean Sea and Atlantic Ocean. She was withdrawn from service at the end of 1944, and sold for scrap in 1948.

Design and description 
The Queen Elizabeth-class ships were designed to form a fast squadron for the fleet that was intended to operate against the leading ships of the opposing battleline. This required maximum offensive power and a speed several knots faster than any other battleship to allow them to defeat any type of ship.

She was powered by two sets of Parsons steam turbines, each driving two shafts using steam from 24 Babcock & Wilcox boilers. Her crew numbered 1,217 officers and ratings in 1919.

The Queen Elizabeth class was equipped with eight breech-loading (BL)  Mk I guns in four twin-gun turrets, in two superfiring pairs fore and aft of the superstructure, designated 'A', 'B', 'X', and 'Y' from front to rear. Twelve of the fourteen BL  Mk XII guns were mounted in casemates along the broadside of the vessel amidships; the remaining pair were mounted on the forecastle deck near the aft funnel and were protected by gun shields. The anti-aircraft (AA) armament were composed of two quick-firing (QF)  20 cwt Mk I guns. The ships were fitted with four submerged 21-inch (533 mm) torpedo tubes, two on each broadside.

Malaya was completed with two fire-control directors fitted with  rangefinders. One was mounted above the conning tower, protected by an armoured hood, and the other was in the spotting top above the tripod foremast. Each turret was also fitted with a 15-foot rangefinder. The main armament could be controlled by 'B' turret as well. The secondary armament was primarily controlled by directors mounted on each side of the compass platform on the foremast once they were fitted in April 1917.

The main conning tower was protected by 13 inches of armour. After the Battle of Jutland, 1 inch of high-tensile steel was added to the main deck over the magazines and additional anti-flash equipment was added in the magazines.

The ship was fitted with flying-off platforms mounted on the roofs of 'B' and 'X' turrets in 1918, from which fighters and reconnaissance aircraft could launch. Exactly when the platforms were removed is unknown, but no later than Malayas 1934–1936 reconstruction.

Construction and career

First World War
Malaya was built by Sir W. G. Armstrong Whitworth and Company at High Walker, Newcastle upon Tyne, and launched in March 1915. She was named in honour of the Federated Malay States in British Malaya, whose government paid for her construction.
She served in Rear-Admiral Hugh Evan-Thomas's 5th Battle Squadron of the Grand Fleet. She took part in the Battle of Jutland, on 31 May 1916, where she was hit eight times and took major damage and heavy crew casualties. A total of 65 men died, in the battle or later of their injuries. Among the wounded was Able Seaman Willie Vicarage, notable as one of the first men to receive facial reconstruction using plastic surgery and the first to receive radical reconstruction via the "tubed pedicule" technique pioneered by Sir Harold Gillies. Uniquely among the ships at the battle, HMS Malaya flew the red-white-black-yellow ensign of the Federated Malay States. Other than Jutland, and the inconclusive Action of 19 August, her service during the First World War mostly consisted of routine patrols and training in the North Sea.

Between the wars
On 17 November 1922 Malaya carried the last Sultan of the Ottoman Empire, Mehmed VI, from Istanbul into exile on Malta. In August–September 1938 she served in the port of Haifa during the 1936–39 Arab revolt in Palestine.

Unlike her sisters Queen Elizabeth, Warspite and Valiant, Malaya did not undergo a comprehensive reconstruction between the wars. She did receive a Le Cheminant deck watch from the Royal Observatory on 5 April 1933.

Second World War

Malaya served in the Mediterranean in 1940, escorting convoys and operating against the Italian fleet. She shelled Genoa in February 1941 as part of Operation Grog but due to a crew error, fired a 15-inch armour-piercing shell into the south-east corner of the Cathedral nave. The fuse failed to detonate.

On 7 March 1941, while escorting convoy SL 67, Malaya encountered the German capital ships  and  that were conducting the Operation Berlin raid which targeted Allied convoys. By her presence she forced them to withdraw rather than risk damage in an attack, although a U-boat attack aiming to sink the Malaya  inflicted some damage on the convoy.

Later that month Malaya was escorting convoy SL 68. Damaged on the port side, and with a 7 degree list due to flooding, Malaya was forced to leave the convoy and make for port, escorted by the corvette Crocus. She reached Trinidad safely on 29 March. After temporary repairs were made, she continued to the New York Navy Yard, where she was docked for four months. During that time, personnel from the ship ferried ten Banff-class sloops to Britain. 

On 9 July, under the command of Captain Cuthbert Coppinger, the battleship left New York on trials and steamed to Halifax, Nova Scotia to provide protection for an urgent fast convoy. No ships were lost, and Malaya arrived in Rosyth on 28 July. Thereafter she escorted convoys from the United Kingdom to Malta and Cape Town until summer 1943.

Malaya was placed in reserve at the end of 1943. During this time her entire secondary 6-inch armament was offloaded and her anti-aircraft armament was enhanced. Between 15 and 17 May 1944, Malaya was used in Loch Striven as a target ship for inert Highball bouncing bomb prototypes, one of which punched a hole in the ship's side. She was reactivated just before the Normandy landings to act as a reserve bombardment battleship.

Fate
Malaya was finally withdrawn from all service at the end of 1944 and became an accommodation ship for a torpedo school. Sold on 20 February 1948 to Metal Industries, Limited she arrived at Faslane on 12 April 1948 for scrapping. The first watch bell was refitted and presented to the Perak Council in Malaya, and was hung in the Council Chamber. The furthermost bell can be seen in the East India Club, and the second watch bell was handed to the Victoria Institution on 12 September 1947, before being handed over to the Royal Malaysian Navy in 2007.

Notes

Citations

References

External links

 Royal Navy History, HMS Malaya, Institute of Naval History
 Page about the ship from battleships-cruisers.co.uk
 Maritimequest HMS Malaya Photo Gallery
 HMS Malaya at navalhistory.net
Battle of Jutland Crew Lists Project - HMS Malaya Crew List

 

Queen Elizabeth-class battleships
Ships built by Armstrong Whitworth
Ships built on the River Tyne
1915 ships
World War I battleships of the United Kingdom
World War II battleships of the United Kingdom
Royal Navy ship names